The Triumph Rocket 3 is a motorcycle by manufacturer Triumph Motorcycles Ltd. Like its predecessor, the Rocket III, it is characterized by an engine that, at , is much larger than any other production motorcycle and consequently has much higher torque. The Rocket 3 is made in three different guises, the sports-oriented R, the touring-oriented GT and the limited-edition TFC.

References

External links 
 Triumph Motorcycles: Rocket-3

Rocket 3
Cruiser motorcycles